Standard Ebooks is an open source, volunteer-driven project to create and publish high-quality, fully featured and accessible e-books of works in the public domain. Standard Ebooks sources titles from places like Project Gutenberg, the Internet Archive, and Wikisource, among others, but differs from those projects in that the goal is to maximize readability for a modern audience, take advantage of accessibility features available in modern e-book file formats, and to streamline updates to the e-books (such as typo fixes) by making use of GitHub as a collaboration tool.

All Standard Ebooks titles are released in epub, azw3, and Kepub formats, and are available through Google Play Books and Apple Books. All of the project's e-book files are released in the United States public domain, and all code is released under the GNU General Public License v3.

Style 
Standard Ebooks produces e-books following a unified style guide, which specifies everything from typography standards to semantic tagging and internal code structure, with the goal of creating a consistent corpus, aligned with modern publishing standards and "cleaned of ancient and irrelevant ephemera." Standard Ebooks works with organizations such as the National Network for Equitable Library Service, and strives to conform to DAISY Consortium accessibility standards, among others, to ensure that all productions will work with modern tools such as screen readers.

With the goal of making public domain works more accessible to modern audiences, archaic spellings are modernized and typographic quirks are addressed "so ebooks look like books and not text documents." This approach stands in contrast to the work of transcription sites like Project Gutenberg, which John Gruber of Daring Fireball described as "an amazing library," but whose books are "a mess typographically."

All covers are derived from public domain fine art. Volunteer e-book producers locate paintings suitable for the work they are producing.

History 
Standard Ebooks was founded by Alex Cabal after experiencing frustration at being unable to find well-formatted English-language e-books while living in Germany. After early experiments with creating a pay what you want edition of Alice's Adventures in Wonderland, the Standard Ebooks website was launched in 2017. Initial notice came from posts on Hacker News and Reddit, with later mentions including Stack Overflow's newsletter.

In 2021, Standard Ebooks launched the ability to accept donations and to be sponsored to produce specific books.

References

External links
 
 Standard Ebooks at GitHub

Ebook suppliers
Public domain
Open access projects
Electronic publishing
 
New media